Armageddon Time is a 2022 American coming-of-age drama film written, directed, and produced by James Gray. The film stars Anne Hathaway, Jeremy Strong, Banks Repeta, Jaylin Webb, and Anthony Hopkins. Inspired by Gray's childhood experiences, the story follows a young Jewish-American boy who befriends an African-American classmate and begins to struggle with expectations from his family and growing up in a world of privilege, inequality and prejudice. It was shot in New Jersey and in Fresh Meadows, Queens, New York where the director James Gray grew up with cinematographer Darius Khondji.

Armageddon Time had its world premiere at the 2022 Cannes Film Festival on May 19, 2022, and was released in the United States via a limited theatrical release on October 28, 2022, by Focus Features, before expanding wide on November 4, 2022. The film received positive reviews from critics, but failed at the box office, grossing over $6 million against a $15 million budget.

Plot
In 1980 Queens, New York City, on his first day in sixth grade, Jewish-American Paul Graff becomes friends with a rebellious African-American classmate named Johnny. Johnny was held back by a year and gets harsher treatment from their teacher when they both joke around in class. Paul often disassociates from his schoolwork and draws pictures instead.

Paul lives with his financially stable family of Jewish heritage. He is close with his maternal grandfather Aaron Rabinowitz, who encourages him to pursue his aspirations of becoming an artist. His well-meaning but strict parents, Esther and Irving, are less convinced by Paul's career prospects to be an artist. At night, Aaron tells Paul the story of how Aaron's mother escaped antisemitic persecution in Ukraine, fleeing to London before eventually immigrating to the United States with Aaron and her British husband.

One day, Paul and Johnny are caught smoking a joint in the restrooms, unaware that it's an illegal drug. Furious, Esther forces Irving into beating Paul as punishment. In the hope that he becomes more disciplined, Paul is sent to the Forest Manor Prep private school by his parents, where his older brother Ted is studying. Meanwhile, Johnny stops going to public school following Paul's expulsion.

Forest Manor is financially supported by famous businessman Fred Trump, who also supports Ronald Reagan in the impending US presidential election. Many of the students are also Reagan supporters. On Paul's first day, Fred's daughter Maryanne, one of the school's famous alumni, delivers a speech to the students about working to earn their success. Paul sees the school's advantages over his previous schooling but still doesn't feel welcome at the school. Paul is also unnerved by racist comments from other students when Johnny meets with him during playtime outdoors. Johnny also begins living in secret at Paul's clubhouse, having nowhere to go other than living with his sick grandmother, where foster system workers searching for Johnny have begun to visit regularly.

While playing at the park on the weekend, Paul tells Aaron of his struggles at school and how he does nothing when he witnesses racism from the other students. Aaron encourages Paul to stand up against prejudice when he sees it; reminding Paul that while antisemitism still covertly persists, he and his family still have the privilege of being white. Shortly after, Aaron dies of bone cancer, with the family mourning his loss.

Tired of living under high expectations from family and school, as well as the unfair treatment of Johnny, Paul convinces Johnny of his plan to steal a computer from school and sell it for money, so they can run away together. Although they successfully steal the computer, they are arrested by the police for trying to sell it. While being interrogated, Paul confesses that it was all his plan, to protect Johnny. However, knowing that he has no options in life, Johnny takes the blame to let Paul go, much to Paul's dismay. Paul and Johnny bid farewell, as Irving arrives to take him home with no consequences due to an officer being an old friend of Irving's. At home, Irving confesses to Paul that he is sympathetic to his frustration with America's unfair racial inequality, but tells him that they need to survive to have a good life. The two agree to not tell Esther what happened, as she is still mourning the loss of her father.

Days later, the Graff family are disappointed by Reagan's victory in the election, while Paul is focused on schoolwork. During a Thanksgiving dance at school, Fred Trump addresses the students, expressing hope that they'll become the next successful elite. A disillusioned Paul leaves the event during the speech.

Cast
 Banks Repeta as Paul Graff
 Anne Hathaway as Esther Graff, Paul's mother and Aaron's daughter
 Jeremy Strong as Irving Graff, Paul's father
 Jaylin Webb as Johnny Davis, Paul's African-American friend and public school classmate
 Anthony Hopkins as Aaron Rabinowitz, Paul's grandfather
 Tovah Feldshuh as Mickey Rabinowitz, Paul's grandmother and Aaron's wife
 Ryan Sell as Ted Graff, Paul's older brother
 John Diehl as Fred Trump, a famous businessman and financier of Forest Manor Prep private school
 Jessica Chastain as Maryanne Trump, Fred's daughter
 Andrew Polk as Mr. Turkeltaub, Paul and Johnny's public school teacher
 Teddy Coluca as Uncle Louis, Paul's uncle
 Marcia Haufrecht as Aunt Ruth, Paul's aunt
 Dane West as Topper Lowell, Paul's friend at Forest Manor
 Richard Bekins as Forest Manor Headmaster Fitzroy
 Domenick Lombardozzi as Police Sergeant D’Arienzo
 Marcia Jean Kurtz as Forest Manor Student Guide 
 Landon James Forlenza as Chad Eastman, Topper's friend
 Eva Jette Putrello as Veronika Bronfman, a Forest Manor student
 Jacob MacKinnon as Edgar Romanelli, a public school student

Production

On May 16, 2019, Variety reported that James Gray would be writing and directing Armageddon Time, a film based on his upbringing in Queens, New York. Cate Blanchett was cast in May 2020, with Gray stating that she would shoot all her scenes in three days, including a lengthy monologue. The following month, Robert De Niro, Oscar Isaac, Donald Sutherland, and Anne Hathaway were added to the cast, with plans to film in New York City once the effects of the COVID-19 pandemic were minimal.

Filming began in October 2021 in New Jersey. It was initially expected to start in early 2021. In October it was reported that Anthony Hopkins and Jeremy Strong would also star alongside newcomers Banks Repeta, Jaylin Webb, and Ryan Sell, with Hopkins and Strong replacing De Niro and Isaac, respectively. Production wrapped in December 2021 and Andrew Polk and Tovah Feldshuh were confirmed to star. Domenick Lombardozzi was revealed as part of the cast in March 2022. Jessica Chastain was later revealed to have replaced Blanchett in a cameo role.

The title comes from a song by The Clash, titled "Armagideon Time", which is heard several times through the film.

Release
The film premiered at the 2022 Cannes Film Festival on May 19, 2022, where it received a seven-minute standing ovation from the audience. It began a limited release in the United States on October 28, 2022, before expanding nationwide on November 4. It was distributed in the US by Focus Features and internationally by Universal Pictures.

The film was released for VOD platforms on November 22, 2022. It was released on Blu-ray and DVD on January 3, 2023 by Universal Pictures Home Entertainment/Studio Distribution Services.

Reception

Box office
The film grossed $1.9 million domestically and $4.2 million in international territories, cumulating in a worldwide total of $6.1 million. Sources such as Variety attributed this performance to poor marketing, a mixed audience reception and the general public losing interest in supporting prestige films in favor of MCU franchise/horror films in a moviegoing environment altered by the pandemic. James Gray responded, calling the film's financial performance a "failure" and warned that it was becoming a growing trend that films of this kind will continue to fail commercially as a result of this new audience behavior, but went on to say "you’re now in a situation where literally every single one of these [non-franchise] movies is not doing well, and in some ways, that’s the great equalizer ... But you also know as a film person that has absolutely no bearing on the long-term reaction to a film. I’m a film person, and I have no idea what the box office receipts were of, you know, A Clockwork Orange or something. So I try to divorce myself from that as well. Because I can’t do anything about it."

Critical reception

 Metacritic, which uses a weighted average, assigned a score of 74 out of 100 based on 54 critics, indicating "generally favorable reviews".

Accolades

References

External links
 
 
 
 
 
 Official screenplay

2022 drama films
2022 films
2020s American films
2020s coming-of-age drama films
American drama films
Autobiographical films
African American–Jewish relations
American coming-of-age films
2022 independent films
2020s English-language films
Films about dysfunctional families
Films about friendship
Films about Jews and Judaism
Films about racism
Films directed by James Gray
Films impacted by the COVID-19 pandemic
Films set in New York City
Films set in Queens, New York
Films set in schools
Films set in the 1980s
Films set in 1980
Films shot in New Jersey
Focus Features films
Universal Pictures films